The Women's balance beam competition at the 2018 Commonwealth Games took place on April 9 at the Coomera Indoor Sports Centre in Gold Coast, Australia.

Schedule
The schedule is as follows:

All times are Australian Eastern Standard Time (UTC+10:00)

Results

Qualification

Qualification for this apparatus final was determined within the team final.

Final
The results are as follows:

References

External links
Official results

Gymnastics at the 2018 Commonwealth Games
2018 in women's gymnastics